Ambrose Cheung Wing-sum, BBS, JP (born 10 January 1951) is a businessman, solicitor and is a former member of the Legislative Council of Hong Kong in 1998–2000 for the Urban Council constituency and incumbent Sham Shui Po District Council (Mei Foo North constituency) from 1982 to 2019 and chairman of the Sham Shui Po District Council between 2016 and 2019.

Biography
Cheung was born in Hong Kong in 1951. After Cheung obtained his bachelor's degree of Social Sciences form the University of Hong Kong in 1973, he joined the Standard Chartered Bank and was sent to the London headquarters and European branches for a year. He resigned from the bank to studied law in London and returned to Hong Kong in 1981.

He was first appointed to the Sham Shui Po District Board in 1982 and has been held the office since. He has continuously been running for the office since the 1985 District Board elections. He was member of the Urban Council and was elected to the Legislative Council of Hong Kong by all the Urban Councillors in 1998 LegCo election through the Urban Council constituency. In 1999, as the representative of the Urban Council in the legislature, Cheung resigned from the LegCo post to protest government's decision of abolishing the two municipal councils.

Cheung was member of the Liberal Party but soon quit the party after its bad performance in the 1994 District Board elections, stating his disappointment to the party's lack of commitment to the local development.

In 2016, he was elected chairman of the Sham Shui Po District Council.

References

1951 births
Living people
Members of the Urban Council of Hong Kong
District councillors of Sham Shui Po District
HK LegCo Members 1998–2000
Solicitors of Hong Kong
Liberal Party (Hong Kong) politicians
Alumni of the University of Hong Kong
Members of the Election Committee of Hong Kong, 2012–2017
Recipients of the Bronze Bauhinia Star